Bellaire Gardens is an unincorporated community in Marion Township, Marion County, Ohio, United States.

References

Unincorporated communities in Marion County, Ohio